Chavittu is a 2022 Indian Malayalam-language drama film written, edited and directed by Rahman brothers, Shinos & Sajas. The film is the maiden production of actor Sharaf U Dheen under the banner Sharafudheen & Friends. The members of the Little Earth Theatre troupe based in Malappuram form the major cast of the film. A hybrid of documentary and dramatisation, the film pays homage to the talented and hardworking theatre artists while juxtaposing it with the hypocrisy of the supposed elite society.

The film premiered at the Harbour section of International Film Festival Rotterdam and also got screened at 25th International Film Festival of Kerala in the Malayalam Cinema Today category. The film was awarded the Kerala State Film Award for Second Best Film at 52nd Kerala State Film Awards.

Synopsis 
Somewhere in the Indian state of Kerala, a theatre company prepares for its performance during festivities. They arrive early, rehearse their piece, and put the finishing touches to the scenery. This alternates with atmospheric scenes of men rehearsing, singing, and perfecting choreographies at a remote location in nature. In the meantime, the theatre slowly fills with other acts, family, and organisers who sometimes interfere with the theatre group. When evening has come at last, various acts are performed and speeches are given before the group can finally stand in the spotlights.

Cast 

 Arun Lal
 Rajesh MP
 Akhil KP
 Mithun Lal
 Suresh K
 Srijesh K
 Abit PT

Awards 
Kerala State Film Awards 2022

 Kerala State Film Award for Second Best Film
 Kerala State Film Award for Best Sync Sound - Arun Asok, Sonu K.P
 Kerala State Film Award for Best Choreography - Arun Lal

References 

2022 films
Films about social issues in India
2020s Malayalam-language films